The President of the Chamber of Deputies of Romania is the deputy elected to preside over the meetings in the lower chamber of the Parliament of Romania. The President is also the President of the Standing Bureau of the Chamber of Deputies, and the second in the presidential line of succession, after the President of the Senate.

Electoral System 

The President of the Chamber of Deputies is elected by secret ballot with the majority of votes of the deputies. If none of the candidates receives the absolute majority of votes, the first two compete again in a second ballot, and the one with most of the votes wins.

References 

2020 elections in Romania
 Election of the President of the Chamber of Deputies